"Send It!" is a song by Australian hip-hop musician Hooligan Hefs, released as a standalone single on 18 November 2020 through DB Music and Warner Music Australia.

"Send It!" debuted and peaked at number 31 on the ARIA Singles Chart, becoming Hefs' highest entry to date.

At the 2021 ARIA Music Awards, the song was nominated for Song of the Year.

At the APRA Music Awards of 2022, the song was nominated for Most Performed Hip Hop/Rap Work.

Background
Alongside hip-hop artist Open Till L8, Hooligan Hefs recalled that when they conjured up the song, they "knew it was a big tune" with Hefs saying upon release that he was "keen to finally get it out to the people. This is the song for summer, grab your drink, Send It! and party hard."

Critical reception
Al Newstead from ABC called the song "an unapologetically energetic party banger".

Brittany Jenke from Tone Deaf called the song "an absolute banger", saying "it's got absolutely everything you could ever want in a hip-hop jam – thrilling beats, a driving chorus and unparalleled rhythms that will get you moving about right quick". Jenke opined the song "...marks a monumental moment in Hooligan Hefs' music career, helping him to redefine the genre of homegrown hip-hop and cementing him in the music scene as an artist with his own trail to blaze".

Music video
The music video was produced by Jaen Collective, directed by Jon Baxter and released on 18 November 2020. In the video, Hooligan Hefs is wearing a hi-vis vest and drives around on a postie bike before arriving at a party after the day's work.

Charts

Weekly charts

Year-end charts

Certification

References

2020 singles
2020 songs
Hooligan Hefs songs
Songs written by Hooligan Hefs